"Let It Go" is an electropop/new wave song performed by Canadian band Dragonette. The song was written and produced by Dragonette for their third studio album Bodyparts (2012). It was released as the album's lead single in April 2012.

Music video
The official music video for the track premiered May 2, 2012, on Dragonette's official VEVO channel, following a trailer for the video, which was released a week before. The video features a number of scientists, played by the male members of the band, along with extras, who kidnap Martina Sorbara and a group of extras to "leach happiness" from the unsuspecting victims, and condensing it into pills, to ensure happiness of every user.

Track listing

Digital Download 
(Released )

Digital Remix EP 
(Released )

Charts

Weekly charts

Year-end charts

Release history

References

2012 singles
2012 songs
Dragonette songs
Mercury Records singles
Songs written by Martina Sorbara
Songs written by Dan Kurtz